Thomas Bancroft (died before 1636), of Santon, Norfolk and St Faith under St Paul's, London, was an English politician.

He was a Member (MP) of the Parliament of England for Castle Rising in 1624, 1625, 1626 and 1628.

His wife was named Margaret and they had three daughters.

References

Year of birth missing
Year of death missing
English MPs 1624–1625
English MPs 1625
English MPs 1626
English MPs 1628–1629
People from Breckland District
Politicians from London
People from the City of London